This is a survey of the postage stamps and postal history of Venezuela.

Venezuela is a country on the northern coast of South America. It is a continental mainland with numerous islands located off its coastline in the Caribbean Sea. The republic is a former Spanish colony, that won its independence in 1821.

First stamps 
The first stamps of the Venezuela were issued on 1 January 1859.

Venezuela supported its territorial claim in the Venezuela Crisis of 1895 by printing an 1896 postage stamp with a map showing Guyana up to the east bank of the Essequibo River as "Guayana Venezolana". Guyana years later responded with a series of overprints “ESSEQUIBO IS OURS”.

British stamps 
British stamps were used at La Guaira between 1865 and 1880 which may be identified by the cancel C60. British stamps used at Ciudad Bolivar (1868-80) had the cancel D22.

See also 
 List of people on stamps of Venezuela

References

Further reading

Monographs
 Blanco Quintanilla, Aurelio. Venezuela: Catalogo Especializado de Estampillas. 2nd Edition. Caracas: The Author, 1992 487p.
 Brunel, Georges. Les Emissions Postales du Venezuela. Paris: Editions philateliques, 1931 62p.
 Dib Espejo, Pedro José. Estudios y comentarios sobre filatelia venezolana y otros temas universales. Caracas: Tip. Vargas, 1971 127p.
 Hall, Thomas W. and L.W. Fulcher. The Postage Stamps of Venezuela. Plymouth: Published for the authors by William Brendon & Son, Ltd, The Mayflower Press, 1924 170p.
 Valera, Juan Jose. Catalogo Especializado de las Estampillas de Venezuela. Caracas: Club Filatelico de Caracas, 1985 536p.
 Vélez-Salas, Francisco. Orígenes Postales de Venezuela. Caracas: Impr. Nacional, 1949 451p.
 Wickersham, Cornelius W. The Early Stamps of Venezuela. New York: Collectors' Club, 1958 156p.

Article
 "The Stamps of Venezuela: Escuelas 1871-79" by L.W. Fulcher in Stanley Gibbons Monthly Journal, April 1925.
 Reproduced here.
 Archived here.

External links 

 The "Correos" Stamps of Venezuela (archived here)

Philately of Venezuela
History of Venezuela